Stardome Observatory (IAU observatory code 467, previously known as Auckland Observatory) is a public astronomical observatory situated in Maungakiekie/One Tree Hill Domain in Auckland, New Zealand.

Founded in 1967, the observatory is administered by the Auckland Observatory and Planetarium Trust Board. The Trust Board was created by the Auckland Astronomical Society (AAS) in 1956. The society is now based at the observatory.

Functions

Research 

In 1969, the observatory (then called Auckland Observatory) constructed a UBV photoelectric photometer with assistance from the University of Auckland. This photometer on the Zeiss telescope became a very successful instrument and produced a significant number of published research papers. Probably the most important discovery was the phenomenon of "super-humps" in the SU Ursae Majoris class of cataclysmic binary stars in 1974.

In 1988, the observatory participated in the discovery of the atmosphere of Pluto by measuring the brightness change as the planet passed in front of a star.

During the 1980s the Zeiss telescope was used to support several doctoral students from the University of Auckland (most notably Rodger Freeth), including the development of a new computer-controlled photon counting photometer. Regular UBV photometry of variable stars continued until 1998 when a CCD camera was first used.

In 1999, a Celestron C-14 Schmidt-Cassegrain telescope was provided by the Nustrini family for installation in the newly built second dome at Stardome Observatory. A grant from the ASB Trust was used to buy a Paramount GT1100s mounting (manufactured by Software Bisque) and an Apogee AP8p CCD camera. The Apogee camera has a back-illuminated SITe003 CCD (1024×1024 24-micrometre pixels). The field of view is 22 arc-minutes. The 0.35 m (f/11) Nustrini telescope is used only for research. In 2006 the Celestron C-14 telescope was replaced by a 40 cm Meade ACF (F/10) and in 2008 CCD camera was replaced by a SBIG ST-6303. The Meade ACF telescope uses an OG530 Orange Schott Optical Glass Filter.

Stardome Observatory is a member of the microFUN collaboration which attempts to detect extra-solar planets by gravitational microlensing. MicroFUN is based at the Astronomy Department of Ohio State University and coordinates the observation of high-magnification microlensing events. In April 2005, microFUN contributed significantly to the discovery of a Jovian-mass planet (OGLE-2005-BLG-071L), the second planet to be detected in this way. In 2005, the Stardome contributed 250 hours of time-series photometry to this collaboration.

The Stardome also contributes to the Center for Backyard Astrophysics (CBA) in New York City as CBA-Auckland. This professional-amateur network monitors selected cataclysmic binary stars and contributes to the understanding of these objects. During 2005, over 250 hours of observations where contributed to the CBA.

Stardome makes regular astrometric observations of comets and near-Earth objects (NEOs) for the Minor Planet Center. In 2004, observations were made of the NEO 2004 FH which was at the time the closest natural object detected from Earth (43,000 km). CCD photometry obtained at the Stardome showed that the object was rotating in 3 minutes, the fastest rotation rate measured for any solar system object.

Research at Stardome Observatory is performed on a voluntary basis.

Outreach 

The 1,000 square metres facility has two telescope domes and a planetarium. The observatory has three primary functions: public outreach, education and research. There is a permanent staff of 9 people who are supported by about 12 part-time staff and some 30 volunteers.

Stardome receives approximately 55,000 visitors per year.

Education 

Three full-time and one part-time education presenters provide curriculum-based astronomy and space topics and activities to about 45,000 school pupils each year. This education programme covers all ages, from year level 1 to 13, and is funded primarily through the Education Department Learning Experiences Outside the Classroom (LEOTC) programme.

In addition to the LEOTC programme, sessions are also provided for kindergarten and pre-schoolers, university students, military personnel (primarily celestial navigation), geo-survey students, senior citizens, corporate and other specialised groups. Bookings usually comprise a planetarium feature show, a night-sky presentation, time exploring the foyer exhibits and displays, and a selection from a 'classroom' session and other activities such as rocket launch demonstration, Matariki focus, and telescope viewing.

Facilities 

The planetarium was added during extensive additions in 1997. Seating 78 people within the 11 metre dome, it used a Zeiss ZKP3 star projector, 18 panorama and all-sky slide projectors, and a video projector. Some of the shows were produced by the Stardome while others were purchased and modified for local use. This was replaced with an E&S Digistar 3 computerised projection system in early 2008, utilising two Sony projectors. This has subsequently been upgraded to Digistar 4, 5 and now version 6. The original projectors were replaced early 2018 with laser-based projectors.

Edith Winstone Blackwell Telescope 

The primary fixed telescope is the 0.5 m Edith Winstone Blackwell Telescope (EWB) which is a classical Cassegrain reflector (f/13.3) manufactured by Carl Zeiss of Jena. It was installed in late 1966 and is one of about 20 comparable instruments produced by Zeiss. It is mounted on an offset German equatorial mount. The optical tube assembly weighs about 500 kg and the overall weight, including the mount, is 2500 kg.

The Zeiss telescope was purchased with money from a gift to the people of Auckland by the late Edith Winstone Blackwell MBE. It has been heavily used for both public viewing and research since being commissioned in 1967.

In 2003 it underwent a complete renovation. A project began in October 2018 to upgrade the telescope to full digital pointing and slewing. The work was completed in 2019.

See also 
 List of astronomical observatories
 List of astronomical societies
 List of planetariums
 Lists of telescopes

References

External links 
 Stardome Observatory website
 Auckland Astronomical Society website

1960s architecture in New Zealand
Astronomical observatories in New Zealand
Buildings and structures in Auckland
Education in Auckland
Minor-planet discovering observatories
Public observatories
Tourist attractions in Auckland